René Chesneau (17 September 1919 – 25 October 2006) was a French wrestler. He competed at the 1948 Summer Olympics and the 1952 Summer Olympics.

References

External links
 

1919 births
2006 deaths
French male sport wrestlers
Olympic wrestlers of France
Wrestlers at the 1948 Summer Olympics
Wrestlers at the 1952 Summer Olympics
Place of birth missing